Code Orange is a political movement in the Netherlands.

History 
Code Orange was founded on 25 October 2018 by Bert Blase, the interim mayor of Heerhugowaard. The movement advocates for more influence for citizens in political decision-making, for instance through binding referendums and citizens' assemblies.

In 2019, Code Orange participated in the provincial elections in four provinces, but did not win any seats. The movement also took part in the 2021 general election, but failed to win a seat. Richard de Mos was chosen as its lijsttrekker.

Election results

House of Representatives

Provincial elections

References

External links 
 Official website

Political parties in the Netherlands
Political parties established in 2018
2018 establishments in the Netherlands
Direct democracy parties
Political movements in the Netherlands